A push present (also called a push gift) is a present a partner or family gives to the mother to mark the occasion of her giving birth to their child. In practice the present may be given before or after the birth, or even in the delivery room. The giving of push presents has supposedly grown in the United States in recent years.

Possible origins 
There is no conclusive evidence that the present was invented by the jewelry industry to sell more goods, and until recently it was passed on largely by word of mouth or peer pressure among both mothers and fathers. According to Linda Murray, the executive editor of BabyCenter, "It's an expectation of moms these days that they deserve something for bearing the burden for nine months, getting sick, ruining their body. The guilt really gets piled on." Other sources trace the development of the present to the increased assertiveness of women, allowing them to ask for a present more directly, or the increased involvement of the men in pregnancy, making them more informed of the pain and difficulty of pregnancy and labor.

Frequency
A 2004 survey of over 30,000 respondents by BabyCenter found that 38% of new mothers received a push present, and 55% of pregnant mothers wanted one, though fewer thought it was actually expected. About 40% of both groups said the baby itself was already a present and did not wish an additional reward.

The popularity of push presents has been attributed in part to media coverage of celebrities receiving them. Examples include a 10 carat diamond ring given to celebrity stylist Rachel Zoe by her husband Rodger after the 2011 birth of their son, a Bentley given to reality TV star Peggy Tanous of The Real Housewives of Orange County by her husband Micah after the 2007 birth of their daughter, and a diamond and sapphire necklace given to singer Mariah Carey by her husband Nick Cannon after the 2011 birth of their twins.

The trend has generated a backlash, as some couples dislike the implicit materialism of push presents, and would prefer increased help in chores or baby care, or save the money for the child's education.

According to etiquette expert Pamela Holland, there are no set guidelines for push presents. "The standard is that there is no standard," she said. "It does make sense to have etiquette around wedding or baby shower gifts because you're inviting other people into it. But this is far too intimate to have a rule." In general it is the woman who lets her man know about push presents, not the other way around, although there can be peer pressure from friends to buy one on either the man or the woman.

Analysis of conversations on parenting website the BabyCenter's online community over the last three years found that mentions of push presents had increased by 41 per cent in the past 18 months, compared to only a two per cent increase between 2011 and 2012. A poll of 1,200 BabyCenter mothers also revealed that more than a quarter (27%) were expecting, or had already received, a push present this year. Diamonds were the most popular gift in the form of an eternity ring with the prices spent ranging from $600 to $1,700. Tablet computers, charm bracelets and designer watches, and handbags were also popular gifts to celebrate a new arrival.

See also
desco da parto or birth tray
Baby shower

References 

Giving
Childbirth
Etiquette